In hyperbolic geometry, an earthquake map is a method of changing one hyperbolic manifold into another, introduced by .

Earthquake maps

Given a simple closed geodesic on an oriented hyperbolic surface and a real number t, one can cut the manifold along the geodesic, slide the edges a distance t to the left, and glue them back. This gives a new hyperbolic surface, and the (possibly discontinuous) map between them is an example of a left earthquake.

More generally one can do the same construction with a finite number of disjoint simple geodesics, each with a real number attached to it. The result is called a simple earthquake.

An earthquake is roughly a sort of limit of simple earthquakes, where one has an infinite number of geodesics, and instead of attaching a positive real number to each geodesic one puts a measure on them.

A geodesic lamination of a hyperbolic surface is a closed subset with a foliation by geodesics. A left earthquake E consists of a map between copies of the hyperbolic plane with geodesic laminations, that is an isometry from each stratum of the foliation to a stratum. Moreover, if A and B are two strata then EE is a hyperbolic transformation whose axis separates A and B and which translates to the left, where EA is the isometry of the whole plane that restricts to E on A, and likewise for B.

Earthquake theorem

Thurston's earthquake theorem states that for  any two points x, y of a Teichmüller space there is a unique left earthquake from x to y.

References

Hyperbolic geometry
Functions and mappings